Point Blank is a Canadian television comedy series that aired on The Comedy Network in 2002.

Evolving out of the earlier Double Exposure, the show starred Linda Cullen and Bob Robertson as Diane-Barbara Jane and Steele Drummond, respectively, the anchors of an television tabloid newsmagazine which covered news stories, such as alien abduction, human cloning, styrofoam mining and two-ply toilet paper, that went "beyond the truth and below the standards". Cullen and Robertson were the show's sole constant core cast, while a wide variety of Canadian comedians and actors made appearances as characters or journalists in news reports.

Thirteen episodes of the series were produced and aired.

Cast

 Tammy Bentz - Macarthur Fantutti
 Mark Brandon - Rock Granite
 Save Cameron - Yannick Paduch
 Nicola Crosbie - Kitty Cowlick
 Diana Frances - Trinity Whiskers
 Jason Emanuel - Luiz Emilio de Pollo
 Andrew Grose - Turdmore Hacking
 Roger Haskett - Medgar O'Hill
 Campbell Lane - Harry Flotsam
 Marjorie Malpass - Phoebe Torque
 Dagmar Midcap - Herpzibah Fridge
 John Murphy - Chase Bullion
 Trish Pattenden - Sandy Stout
 Jeff Rechner - Announcer
 Yvonne Myers - Sh'lwannalah Jackson
 Tanya Reid - Rain Bongwater
 Chris Robson - Maytag Hogswallop
 Ben Wilkinson - Julian Van Wart
 Moishe Teichman - Mayor

References

External links
 Point Blank

2000s Canadian satirical television series
2000s Canadian sketch comedy television series
2002 Canadian television series debuts
2002 Canadian television series endings
CTV Comedy Channel original programming
Canadian news parodies